The 2011–12 season was Burton Albion's third consecutive season in League Two.

League table

Squad statistics

Appearances and goals

|-
|colspan="14"|Players featured for Burton but left before the end of the season:

|-
|colspan="14"|Players played for Burton on loan who have returned to their parent club:

|}

Top scorers

Disciplinary record

Club

Coaching and Medical Staff

Last updated 17 September 2012.
Source: 
Includes staff registered with club on 5 May 2012.

Managerial change

Following Burton's victory over Northampton Town on 26 December 2011, the club then went 14 consecutive games without a victory. This prompted chairman Ben Robinson to sack Paul Peschisolido on 17 March 2012. Gary Rowett and Kevin Poole were put in temporary charge until a new manager could be found. Rowett was subsequently put in charge of the club on a permanent basis on 11 May 2012 in time for the new season.

Players
As of 5 May 2012.

Source: Burton Albion, Soccerbase
Ordered by position then squad number.
Appearances (starts and substitute appearances) and goals include those in competitive matches in The Football League, The Football Conference, FA Cup, League Cup, Football League Trophy, FA Trophy and Conference League Cup.
1Player/Goalkeeping coach. Oldest registered player in The Football League.
2Club Captain.
3Undisclosed fee reported by the Burton Mail to be £20K.
4Appearances include previous spell with club in 2010–11

Kit

|
|
|

Burton's away kit was retained from the previous season, as was the Mr. Cropper sponsorship brand. TAG Leisure continue to manufacture the club's matchday and training attire. The new home kit was unveiled on 15 July before the pre-season friendly with Derby County. Following 16 years of plain yellow shirts, it marks a return to the traditional black and yellow stripes that had been worn by the club from its foundation through to the mid-1990s. The kit will be used for all club competitions and will remain in use until the end of the 2012–13 league season.

Other Information

Results

Pre-Season Friendlies

League Two

League Two Results summary

Results by round

FA Cup

League Cup

Football League Trophy

Transfers

Awards

Source: Burton AlbionLast updated 18 May 2012.

References

Burton Albion
Burton Albion F.C. seasons